Baldur Möller (Reykjavík, 19 August 1914 – 23 November 1999) was an Icelandic chess master.

He was multiple Icelandic champion (won in 1938, 1941, 1943, 1947, 1948, 1950, and retained his title in 1939).

Möller won twice Nordic Chess Championship in 1948 and 1950.

He played thrice for Iceland in Chess Olympiads:
 In 1937, at fourth board in 7th Chess Olympiad in Stockholm (+3 –11 =2);
 In 1939, at fourth board in 8th Chess Olympiad in Buenos Aires (+6 –5 =4);
 In 1956, at fourth board in 12th Chess Olympiad in Moscow (+7 –1 =8).

References

External links 
 
 Baldur Möller's obituary 

1914 births
1999 deaths
Icelandic chess players
20th-century chess players